Thomas Farrington (February 12, 1799 – December 2, 1872) was an American lawyer and politician.

Life
He was born on February 12, 1799, in Delhi, New York. Farrington lived at Owego.

He was a Democratic member from Tioga County of the New York State Assembly in 1833 and 1840, Surrogate of Tioga County from 1835 to 1840, New York State Treasurer from 1842 to 1845 and from 1846 to 1847, and Adjutant General of the New York State Militia from 1845 to 1846.

He was also a delegate to the 1856 Republican National Convention.

Sources
Political Graveyard
The New York Civil List compiled by Franklin Benjamin Hough (pages 35, 273 and 418; Weed, Parsons and Co., 1858)

1798 births
1872 deaths
Members of the New York State Assembly
New York State Treasurers
People from Owego, New York
New York (state) Democrats
New York (state) Republicans
19th-century American politicians